This article presents a list of the historical events and publications of Australian literature during 1928.

Books 

 Martin Boyd – The Montforts (aka The Madeleine Heritage)
 Bernard Cronin
 Bracken
 Dragonfly
 Jean Devanny – Dawn Beloved
 Mabel Forrest – Reaping Roses
 Miles Franklin – Up the Country
 Jack McLaren – Sun Man
 Vance Palmer – The Man Hamilton
 Katharine Susannah Prichard – Coonardoo
 Alice Grant Rosman
 The Back Seat Driver
 The Window
 Nevil Shute – So Disdained
 Arthur W. Upfield – The House of Cain

Short stories 

 Nettie Palmer – "An Australian Story-Book" (edited)
 Katharine Susannah Prichard
 "The Cow"
 "White Kid Gloves"

Poetry 

 John Le Gay Brereton – Swags Up!
 George Essex Evans – The Collected Verse of G. Essex Evans 
 Leon Gellert
 "At Anzac"
 "Rendezvous"
 Mary Gilmore – "The Gordon Fox!"
 Kenneth Slessor
 "The All-Night Taxi Stand"
 "Choker's Lane"
 "Earth-Visitors"
 "Up in Mabel's Room"

Children's and Young Adult fiction 

 Ethel Turner – Judy and Punch
 Lilian Turner – Ann Chooses Glory

Awards and honours

Literary

Births 

A list, ordered by date of birth (and, if the date is either unspecified or repeated, ordered alphabetically by surname) of births in 1928 of Australian literary figures, authors of written works or literature-related individuals follows, including year of death.

 8 February – Elizabeth Harrower, novelist (died 2020)
 14 February – Bruce Beaver, poet (died 2004)
 13 March – Bob Brissenden, poet, novelist, critic and academic (died 1991)
 5 May – Kit Denton, novelist (died 1997)
 21 October – Eleanor Spence, writer for children (died 2008)

Unknown date

Anne Fairbairn, poet, journalist and expert in Arab culture (died 2018)

Deaths 

A list, ordered by date of death (and, if the date is either unspecified or repeated, ordered alphabetically by surname) of deaths in 1928 of Australian literary figures, authors of written works or literature-related individuals follows, including year of birth.

 5 February – David McKee Wright, poet (born 1869)
 19 August – Thomas William Heney, journalist and poet (born 1862)

See also 
 1928 in poetry
 List of years in literature
 List of years in Australian literature
 1928 in literature
 1927 in Australian literature
 1928 in Australia
 1929 in Australian literature

References

Literature
Australian literature by year
20th-century Australian literature